Thelema is a Western esoteric and occult social or spiritual philosophy and new religious movement founded in the early 1900s by Aleister Crowley (1875–1947), an English writer, mystic, occultist, and ceremonial magician. The word thelema is the English transliteration of the Koine Greek noun , "will", from the verb : "to will, wish, want or purpose."

Adherents to Thelema are called Thelemites, and phenomena within the scope of Thelema are termed Thelemic.

Crowley wrote that, in 1904, he had received a text or scripture called The Book of the Law, dictated to him by a potentially non-corporeal entity named Aiwass. This text was to serve as the foundation of the religious and philosophical system he called Thelema.

Crowley identified himself as the prophet of a new era in humanity's spiritual development, a novel age he termed the Æon of Horus. According to Crowley, the facticity of his prophethood was mainly predicated upon his reception of The Book of the Law from Aiwass, an experience that formed the crux of a broader spiritual ordeal that he and his wife, Rose Edith, underwent in Cairo, Egypt in March of 1904.

By Crowley's account, Aiwass contacted him through Rose and subsequently dictated The Book of the Law or Liber AL vel Legis, which outlined the principles of Thelema, to him.

The Thelemic pantheon—a collection of gods and goddesses who either literally exist or serve as symbolic archetypes or metaphors—includes a number of deities, primarily a trio adapted from ancient Egyptian religion, who are the three narrators or "speakers" of The Book of the Law: Nuit, Hadit, and Ra-Hoor-Khuit. In at least one instance, Crowley described these deities as a "literary convenience".

Crowley's later writings included related commentary and hermeneutics on Thelema and Thelemic topics, but also additional "inspired" writings that he collectively termed The Holy Books of Thelema. He associated Thelemic spiritual practice with concepts rooted in occultism, yoga, and Eastern and Western mysticism, especially the Qabalah.

Aspects of Thelema and Crowley's thought in general inspired the development of Wicca and, to a certain degree, the rise of Modern Paganism as a whole, as well as chaos magick and some variations of Satanism. Some scholars, such as Hugh Urban, also believe Thelema to have been an influence on the development of Scientology, but others, such as J. Gordon Melton, argue against there being a connection. 

Since Crowley's death, various adherents to Thelema, including direct disciples of Crowley himself, have made significant contributions to the propagation of and discussion surrounding the religion. For example, Jack Parsons, Kenneth Grant, James Lees, and Nema Andahadna are several influential Thelemites who have arguably contributed to a broader and richer understanding of Thelemic spirituality and philosophy.

Historical precedents
The word  is rare in Classical Greek, where it "signifies the appetitive will: desire, sometimes even sexual", but it is frequent in the Septuagint. Early Christian writings occasionally use the word to refer to the human will, and even the will of God's created faith tester and inquisitor, the Devil, but it usually refers to the will of God.

In his 5th-century Sermon, Augustine of Hippo gave a similar instruction: "Love, and what thou wilt, do.".

In the Renaissance, a character named "Thelemia" represents will or desire in the Hypnerotomachia Poliphili of the Dominican friar Francesco Colonna. The protagonist Poliphilo has two allegorical guides, Logistica (reason) and Thelemia (will or desire). When forced to choose, he chooses fulfillment of his sexual will over logic. Colonna's work was a great influence on the Franciscan friar François Rabelais, who in the 16th century, used Thélème, the French form of the word, as the name of a fictional abbey in his novels, Gargantua and Pantagruel. The only rule of this Abbey was ""  ("", or, "Do what thou wilt").

In the mid-18th century, Sir Francis Dashwood inscribed the adage on a doorway of his abbey at Medmenham, where it served as the motto of the Hellfire Club. Rabelais's Abbey of Thelema has been referred to by later writers Sir Walter Besant and James Rice, in their novel The Monks of Thelema (1878), and C. R. Ashbee in his utopian romance The Building of Thelema (1910).

Definitions

In Classical Greek 
In Classical Greek there are two words for will: thelema and boule.

  means 'determination', 'purpose', 'intention', 'counsel', or 'project'
  means 'divine will', 'inclination', 'desire', or 'pleasure'

'' is a rarely used word in Classical Greek. There are very few documents, the earliest being Antiphon the Sophist (5th century BCE). In antiquity it was beside the divine will which a man performs, just as much for the will of sexual desire. The intention of the individual was less understood as an overall, generalized, ontological place wherever it was arranged.

The verb  appears very early (Homer, early Attic inscriptions) and has the meanings of "ready", "decide" and "desire" (Homer, 3, 272, also in the sexual sense).

"Aristotle says in the book On Plants that the goal of the human will is perception - unlike the plants that do not have '' (translation of the author). "", says the Aristoteles, "has changed here, ''", and '', and that '' is to be neutral, not somehow morally determined, the covetous driving force in man."

In the Old Testament 
In the Septuagint the term is used for the will of God himself, the pious desire of the God-fearing, and the royal will of a secular ruler. It is thus used only for the representation of high ethical willingness in the faith, the exercise of authority by the authorities, or the non-human will, but not for more profane striving. In the  Septuagint, the terms boule and thelema appear, whereas in the Vulgate text, the terms are translated into the Latin voluntas ("will"). Thus, the different meaning of both concepts was lost.

In the New Testament 
In the original Greek version of the New Testament the word thelema is used 62 or 64 times, twice in the plural (thelemata). Here, God's will is always and exclusively designated by the word thelema (θέλημα, mostly in the singular), as the theologian Federico Tolli points out by means of the Theological Dictionary of the New Testament of 1938 ("Your will be done on earth as it is in heaven"). In the same way the term is used in Paul the Apostle and Ignatius of Antioch. For Tolli it follows that the genuine idea of Thelema does not contradict the teachings of Jesus.

François Rabelais and the Abbey of Thélème

François Rabelais was a Franciscan and later a Benedictine monk of the 16th century. Eventually he left the monastery to study medicine, and moved to the French city of Lyon in 1532. There he wrote Gargantua and Pantagruel, a connected series of books. They tell the story of two giants—a father (Gargantua) and his son (Pantagruel) and their adventures—written in an amusing, extravagant, and satirical vein.

Most critics today agree that Rabelais wrote from a Christian humanist perspective. The Crowley biographer Lawrence Sutin notes this when contrasting the French author's beliefs with the Thelema of Aleister Crowley. In the previously mentioned story of Thélème, which critics analyze as referring in part to the suffering of loyal Christian reformists or "evangelicals" within the French Church, the reference to the Greek word θέλημα "declares that the will of God rules in this abbey". Sutin writes that Rabelais was no precursor of Thelema, with his beliefs containing elements of Stoicism and Christian kindness.

In his first book (ch. 52–57), Rabelais writes of this Abbey of Thélème, built by the giant Gargantua. It is a classical utopia presented in order to critique and assess the state of the society of Rabelais's day, as opposed to a modern utopian text that seeks to create the scenario in practice. It is a utopia where people's desires are more fulfilled.  Satirical, it also epitomises the ideals considered in Rabelais's fiction. The inhabitants of the abbey were governed only by their own free will and pleasure, the only rule being "Do What Thou Wilt". Rabelais believed that men who are free, well born and bred have honour, which intrinsically leads to virtuous actions. When constrained, their noble natures turn instead to remove their servitude, because men desire what they are denied.

Some modern Thelemites consider Crowley's work to build upon Rabelais's summary of the instinctively honourable nature of the Thelemite. Rabelais has been variously credited with the creation of the philosophy of Thelema, as one of the earliest people to refer to it. The current National Grand Master General of the U.S. Ordo Templi Orientis Grand Lodge has opined that:

Aleister Crowley wrote in The Antecedents of Thelema (1926), an incomplete work not published in his day, that Rabelais not only set forth the law of Thelema in a way similar to how Crowley understood it, but predicted and described in code Crowley's life and the holy text that he received, The Book of the Law. Crowley said the work he had received was deeper, showing in more detail the technique people should practice, and revealing scientific mysteries. He said that Rabelais confines himself to portraying an ideal, rather than addressing questions of political economy and similar subjects, which must be solved in order to realize the Law.

Rabelais is included among the Saints of Ecclesia Gnostica Catholica.

Francis Dashwood and the Hellfire Club
Sir Francis Dashwood adopted some of the ideas of Rabelais and invoked the same rule in French, when he founded a group called the Monks of Medmenham (better known as the Hellfire Club). An abbey was established at Medmenham, in a property which incorporated the ruins of a Cistercian abbey founded in 1201.  The group was known as the Franciscans, not after Saint Francis of Assisi, but after its founder, Francis Dashwood, 11th Baron le Despencer. John Wilkes, George Dodington and other politicians were members. There is little direct evidence of what Dashwood's Hellfire Club practiced or believed. The one direct testimonial comes from John Wilkes, a member who never got into the chapter-room of the inner circle.

Sir Nathaniel Wraxall in his Historical Memoires (1815) accused the Monks of performing Satanic rituals, but these reports have been dismissed as hearsay. Daniel Willens argued that the group likely practiced Freemasonry, but also suggests Dashwood may have held secret Roman Catholic sacraments. He asks if Wilkes would have recognized a genuine Catholic Mass, even if he saw it himself and even if the underground version followed its public model precisely.

Beliefs

The Book of the Law

Aleister Crowley's system of Thelema begins with The Book of the Law, which bears the official name Liber AL vel Legis. It was written in Cairo, Egypt, during his honeymoon with his new wife Rose Crowley (née Kelly). This small book contains three chapters, each of which he said he had written in exactly one hour, beginning at noon, on April 8, April 9, and April 10, 1904. Crowley wrote that he took dictation from an entity named Aiwass, whom he later identified as his own Holy Guardian Angel. Crowley stated that "no forger could have prepared so complex a set of numerical and literal puzzles" and that study of the text would dispel all doubts about the method of how the book was obtained.

Besides the reference to Rabelais, an analysis by Dave Evans shows similarities to The Beloved of Hathor and Shrine of the Golden Hawk, a play by Florence Farr. Evans says this may result from the fact that "both Farr and Crowley were thoroughly steeped in Golden Dawn imagery and teachings", and that Crowley probably knew the ancient materials that inspired some of Farr's motifs. Sutin also finds similarities between Thelema and the work of W. B. Yeats, attributing this to "shared insight" and perhaps to the older man's knowledge of Crowley.

Crowley wrote several commentaries on The Book of the Law, the last of which he wrote in 1925. This brief statement called simply "The Comment" warns against discussing the book's contents, and states that all "questions of the Law are to be decided only by appeal to my writings" and is signed Ankh-f-n-khonsu.

Axioms
Three statements from The Book of the Law distill the practice and ethics of Thelema. Of these statements, one in particular, known as the Law of Thelema, forms the central doctrine—and, theoretically, sole dogma—of Thelema as a system of thought. The statement of primary importance in Thelema, the Law of Thelema—"Do what thou wilt shall be the whole of the Law"—is supplemented by a second, followup statement: "Love is the law, love under will." These two statements are generally believed to be better appreciated or better understood by considering a third statement: "Every man and every woman is a star."

These three statements have particular meanings:

"Do what thou wilt shall be the whole of the Law", meaning that adherents of Thelema should seek out and follow their true path, i.e. find or determine their True Will.
"Every man and every woman is a star" is a reference to the body of light, said by Plato to be composed of the same substance as the stars; and that persons doing their Wills are thereby like stars in the universe: occupying a time and position in space, yet distinctly individual and having an independent nature largely without undue conflict with other stars.
"Love is the law, love under will", i.e. the nature of the Law of Thelema is love, but love itself is subsidiary to finding and manifesting one's authentic purpose or mission.

Cosmology

Thelema draws its principal gods and goddesses, three altogether as the speakers presented in Liber AL vel Legis, from Ancient Egyptian religion.

The highest deity in the cosmology of Thelema is the goddess Nuit (also spelled Nuith). She is the night sky arched over the Earth symbolized in the form of a naked woman. She is conceived as the "Great Mother", the ultimate source of all things, the collection of all possibilities, "Infinite Space, and the Infinite Stars thereof", and the circumference of an infinite circle or sphere. Nuit is derived from the Egyptian sky goddess Nut, and is referred to poetically as "Our Lady of the Stars", and in The Book of the Law as "Queen of Space", and "Queen of Heaven".

The second principal deity of Thelema is the god Hadit, conceived as the infinitely small point, complement and consort of Nuit.  Hadit symbolizes manifestation, motion, and time. He is also described in Liber AL vel Legis as "the flame that burns in every heart of man, and in the core of every star."

Hadit has sometimes been said to represent a 'point-event,' and all individual point-events within the body of Nuit. Hadit is said, in The Book of the Law, to be "perfect, being Not." Additionally, it is written of Nuit in Liber AL that "men speak not of Thee [Nuit] as One but as None."

The third deity in the cosmology of Thelema is Ra-Hoor-Khuit, a manifestation of Horus. He is symbolized as a throned man with the head of a hawk who carries a wand. He is associated with the Sun and the active energies of Thelemic magick.

Other deities within the cosmology of Thelema are Hoor-paar-kraat (or Harpocrates), god of silence and inner strength, the twin of Ra-Hoor-Khuit, Babalon, the goddess of all pleasure, known as the Virgin Whore, and Therion, the beast that Babalon rides, who represents the wild animal within man, a force of nature.

True Will

According to Crowley, every individual has a True Will, to be distinguished from the ordinary wants and desires of the ego. The True Will is essentially one's "calling" or "purpose" in life. "Do what thou wilt shall be the whole of the Law" for Crowley refers not to hedonism, fulfilling everyday desires, but to acting in response to that calling. According to Lon Milo DuQuette, a Thelemite is anyone who bases their actions on striving to discover and accomplish their true will, when a person does their True Will, it is like an orbit, their niche in the universal order, and the universe assists them:

In order for the individual to be able to follow their True Will, the everyday self's socially-instilled inhibitions may have to be overcome via deconditioning. Crowley believed that in order to discover the True Will, one had to free the desires of the subconscious mind from the control of the conscious mind, especially the restrictions placed on sexual expression, which he associated with the power of divine creation. He identified the True Will of each individual with the Holy Guardian Angel, a daimon unique to each individual. The spiritual quest to find what you are meant to do and do it is also known in Thelema as the Great Work.

Ethics
Liber AL vel Legis does make clear some standards of individual conduct. The primary of these is "Do what thou wilt" which is presented as the whole of the law, and also as a right.  Some interpreters of Thelema believe that this right includes an obligation to allow others to do their own wills without interference, but Liber AL makes no clear statement on the matter.  Crowley himself wrote that there was no need to detail the ethics of Thelema, for everything springs from "Do what thou Wilt". Crowley wrote several additional documents presenting his personal beliefs regarding individual conduct in light of the Law of Thelema, some of which do address the topic interference with others: Liber OZ, Duty, and Liber II
Liber Oz enumerates some of the rights of the individual implied by the one overarching right, "Do what thou wilt". For each person, these include the right to: live by one's own law; live in the way that one wills to do; work, play, and rest as one will; die when and how one will; eat and drink what one will; live where one will; move about the earth as one will; think, speak, write, draw, paint, carve, etch, mould, build, and dress as one will; love when, where and with whom one will; and kill those who would thwart these rights.

Duty is described as "A note on the chief rules of practical conduct to be observed by those who accept the Law of Thelema."  It is not a numbered "Liber" as are all the documents which Crowley intended for A∴A∴, but rather listed as a document intended specifically for Ordo Templi Orientis. There are four sections:

A. Your Duty to Self: describes the self as the center of the universe, with a call to learn about one's inner nature. Admonishes the reader to develop every faculty in a balanced way, establish one's autonomy, and to devote oneself to the service of one's own True Will.
B. Your Duty to Others: An admonishment to eliminate the illusion of separateness between oneself and all others, to fight when necessary, to avoid interfering with the Wills of others, to enlighten others when needed, and to worship the divine nature of all other beings.
C. Your Duty to Mankind: States that the Law of Thelema should be the sole basis of conduct. That the laws of the land should have the aim of securing the greatest liberty for all individuals. Crime is described as being a violation of one's True Will.
D. Your Duty to All Other Beings and Things: States that the Law of Thelema should be applied to all problems and used to decide every ethical question.  It is a violation of the Law of Thelema to use any animal or object for a purpose for which it is unfit, or to ruin things so that they are useless for their purpose.  Natural resources can be used by man, but this should not be done wantonly, or the breach of the law will be avenged.

In Liber II: The Message of the Master Therion, the Law of Thelema is summarized succinctly as "Do what thou wilt—then do nothing else." Crowley describes the pursuit of Will as not only with detachment from possible results, but with tireless energy.  It is Nirvana but in a dynamic rather than static form.  The True Will is described as the individual's orbit, and if they seek to do anything else, they will encounter obstacles, as doing anything other than the will is a hindrance to it.

Practice

The core of Thelemic thought is "Do what thou wilt". However, beyond this, there exists a wide range of interpretation of Thelema. Modern Thelema is a syncretic philosophy and religion, and many Thelemites try to avoid strongly dogmatic or fundamentalist thinking. Crowley himself put strong emphasis on the unique nature of Will inherent in each individual, not following him, saying he did not wish to found a flock of sheep. Thus, contemporary Thelemites may practice more than one religion, including Wicca, Gnosticism, Satanism, Setianism and Luciferianism. Many adherents of Thelema recognize correlations between Thelemic and other systems of spiritual thought; most borrow freely from the methods and practices of other traditions, including alchemy, astrology, qabalah, tantra, tarot divination and yoga. For example, Nu and Had are thought to correspond with the Tao and Teh of Taoism, Shakti and Shiva of the Hindu Tantras, Shunyata and Bodhicitta of Buddhism, Ain Soph and Kether in the Hermetic Qabalah.

Magick

Thelemic magick is a system of physical, mental, and spiritual exercises which practitioners believe are of benefit. Crowley defined magick as "the Science and Art of causing Change to occur in conformity with Will", and spelled it with a 'k' to distinguish it from stage magic. He recommended magick as a means for discovering the True Will. Generally, magical practices in Thelema are designed to assist in finding and manifesting the True Will, although some include celebratory aspects as well. Crowley believed that after discovering the True Will, the magician must also remove any elements of himself that stand in the way of its success.

Crowley was a prolific writer, integrating Eastern practices with Western magical practices from the Hermetic Order of the Golden Dawn. He recommended a number of these practices to his followers, including: basic yoga (asana and pranayama); rituals of his own devising or based on those of the Golden Dawn, such as the lesser ritual of the pentagram, for banishing and invocation; Liber Samekh, a ritual for the invocation of the Holy Guardian Angel; eucharistic rituals such as The Gnostic Mass and The Mass of the Phoenix; and Liber Resh, consisting of four daily adorations to the sun. He also discussed sex magick and sexual gnosis in various forms involving masturbation and sexual intercourse between heterosexual and homosexual partners; practices which are among his suggestions for those in the higher degrees of the Ordo Templi Orientis.

One goal in the study of Thelema within the magical Order of the A∴A∴ is for the magician to obtain the knowledge and conversation of the Holy Guardian Angel: conscious communication with their own personal daimon, thus gaining knowledge of their True Will. The chief task for one who has achieved this goes by the name of "crossing the abyss"; completely relinquishing the ego.  If the aspirant is unprepared, he will cling to the ego instead, becoming a Black Brother. According to Crowley, the Black Brother slowly disintegrates, while preying on others for his own self-aggrandisement.

Crowley taught skeptical examination of all results obtained through meditation or magick, at least for the student. He tied this to the necessity of keeping a magical record or diary, that attempts to list all conditions of the event. Remarking on the similarity of statements made by spiritually advanced people of their experiences, he said that fifty years from his time they would have a scientific name based on "an understanding of the phenomenon" to replace such terms as "spiritual" or "supernatural". Crowley stated that his work and that of his followers used "the method of science; the aim of religion", and that the genuine powers of the magician could in some way be objectively tested. This idea has been taken on by later practitioners of Thelema, chaos magic and magick in general.  They may consider that they are testing hypotheses with each magical experiment. The difficulty lies in the broadness of their definition of success, in which they may see as evidence of success things which a non-magician would not define as such, leading to confirmation bias. Crowley believed he could demonstrate, by his own example, the effectiveness of magick in producing certain subjective experiences that do not ordinarily result from taking hashish, enjoying oneself in Paris, or walking through the Sahara desert. It is not strictly necessary to practice ritual techniques to be a Thelemite, as due to the focus of Thelemic magick on the True Will, Crowley stated "every intentional act is a magickal act."

Gnostic Mass

Holidays
The Book of the Law gives several holy days to be observed by Thelemites. There are no established or dogmatic ways to celebrate these days, so as a result Thelemites will often take to their own devices or celebrate in groups, especially within Ordo Templi Orientis. These holy days are usually observed on the following dates:

 March 20. The Feast of the Supreme Ritual, which celebrates the Invocation of Horus, the ritual performed by Crowley on this date in 1904 that inaugurated the New Aeon.
 March 20/March 21. The Equinox of the Gods, which is commonly referred to as the Thelemic New Year (although some celebrate the New Year on April 8). Although the equinox and the Invocation of Horus often fall on the same day, they are often treated as two different events. This date is the Autumnal equinox in the Southern Hemisphere.
 April 8 through April 10. The Feast of the Three Days of the Writing of the Book of the Law. These three days are commemorative of the three days in the year 1904 during which Aleister Crowley wrote The Book of the Law. One chapter was written each day, the first being written on April 8, the second on April 9, and the third on April 10. Although there is no official way of celebrating any Thelemic holiday, this particular feast day is usually celebrated by reading the corresponding chapter on each of the three days, usually at noon.
 June 20/June 21. The Summer solstice in the Northern Hemisphere and the Winter solstice in the Southern Hemisphere.
 August 12. The Feast of the Prophet and His Bride. This holiday commemorates the marriage of Aleister Crowley and his first wife Rose Edith Crowley. Rose was a key figure in the writing of The Book of the Law.
 September 22/September 23. The Autumnal equinox in the Northern Hemisphere and the Vernal Equinox in the Southern Hemisphere.
 December 21/December 22. The Winter solstice in the Northern Hemisphere and the Summer Solstice in the Southern Hemisphere.
 The Feast for Life, celebrated at the birth of a Thelemite and on birthdays.
 The Feast for Fire/The Feast for Water. These feast days are usually taken as being when a child hits puberty and steps unto the path of adulthood. The Feast for Fire is celebrated for a male, and the Feast for Water for a female.
 The Feast for Death, celebrated on the death of a Thelemite and on the anniversary of their death. Crowley's Death is celebrated on December 1.

Greetings

The number 93 is of great significance in Thelema. The central philosophy of Thelema is in two phrases from Liber AL: "do what thou wilt shall be the whole of the law" and "love is the law, love under will". Crowley urged their use in everyday communications, and himself used them to greet people. Today, rather than using the full phrases, Thelemites often use numerological abbreviations to shorten these greeting in informal contexts, a practice Crowley also applied in his informal written correspondences. The two primary terms in these statements are 'will' and 'love', respectively. Using the Greek technique of isopsephy, which applies a numerical value to each letter, the letters of words thelema ('will') and agape ('love') each sum to 93:

 Thelema:  = 9 + 5 + 30 + 8 + 40 + 1 = 93
 Agapé:  = 1 + 3 + 1 + 80 + 8 = 93

In this way, the first phrase is abbreviated to "93" while the second is abbreviated to "93 93/93", with the division "93/93" symbolizing love "under" will.

Post-Crowley developments
Aleister Crowley was highly prolific and wrote on the subject of Thelema for over 35 years, and many of his books remain in print. During his time, there were several others who wrote on the subject, including U.S. O.T.O. Grand Master Charles Stansfeld Jones, whose works on Qabalah are still in print, and Major-General J. F. C. Fuller. Subsequent to Crowley, a number of figures have made significant contributions to Thelema. Each has their own following within the broader Thelemic community.

Jack Parsons
John Whiteside Parsons (1914–1952) was an American rocket engineer, chemist, and Thelemite occultist. Parsons converted to Thelema, and together with his first wife, Helen Northrup, joined the Agape Lodge, the Californian branch of the Thelemite Ordo Templi Orientis (O.T.O.), in 1941. At Crowley's bidding, Parsons replaced Wilfred Talbot Smith as its leader in 1942 and ran the Lodge from his mansion on Orange Grove Boulevard.

Parsons identified four obstacles that prevented humans from achieving and performing their True Will, all of which he connected with fear: the fear of incompetence, the fear of the opinion of others, the fear of hurting others, and the fear of insecurity. He insisted that these must be overcome, writing that "The Will must be freed of its fetters. The ruthless examination and destruction of taboos, complexes, frustrations, dislikes, fears and disgusts hostile to the Will is essential to progress."

Parsons conducted the Babalon Working, a magical working intended to invoke the Thelemic goddess Babalon on Earth via a series of ceremonial magic rituals performed from January to March 1946 by Jack Parsons and Scientology founder L. Ron Hubbard.  This ritual was essentially designed to manifest an individual incarnation of the archetypal divine feminine called Babalon.

The project was based on the ideas of Crowley, and his description of a similar project in his 1917 novel Moonchild. The rituals performed drew largely upon rituals and sex magic described by Crowley.  Crowley was in correspondence with Parsons during the course of the Babalon Working, and warned Parsons of his potential overreactions to the magic he was performing, while simultaneously deriding Parsons' work to others.

A brief text entitled Liber 49, self-referenced within the text as The Book of Babalon, was written by Jack Parsons as a transmission from the goddess or force called 'Babalon' received by him during the Babalon Working.   Parsons wrote that Liber 49 constituted a fourth chapter of Crowley's Liber AL Vel Legis (The Book of the Law), the holy text of Thelema.

Kenneth Grant

Kenneth Grant (1924–2011) was an English ceremonial magician and advocate of the Thelemic religion. A poet, novelist, and writer, he founded his own Thelemic organisation, the Typhonian Ordo Templi Orientis—later renamed the Typhonian Order—with his wife Steffi Grant.

Grant drew eclectically on a range of sources in devising his teachings. Although based in Thelema, Grant's Typhonian tradition has been described as "a bricolage of occultism, Neo-Vedanta, Hindu tantra, Western sexual magic, Surrealism, ufology and Lovecraftian gnosis". Grant promoted what he termed the Typhonian or Draconian tradition of magic, and wrote that Thelema was only a recent manifestation of this wider tradition. In his books, he portrayed the Typhonian tradition as the world's oldest spiritual tradition, writing that it had ancient roots in Africa. The religious studies scholar Gordan Djurdjevic noted that Grant's historical claims regarding Typhonian history were "at best highly speculative" and lacked any supporting evidence; however he also suggested that Grant may never have intended these claims to be taken literally.

Grant's wrote that Indian spiritual traditions like Tantra and Yoga correlate to Western esoteric traditions, and that both stem from a core, ancient source, has parallels in the perennial philosophy promoted by the Traditionalist School of esotericists. He believed that by mastering magic, one masters this illusory universe, gaining personal liberation and recognising that only the Self really exists. Doing so, according to Grant, leads to the discovery of one's True Will, the central focus of Thelema.  Grant further wrote that the realm of the Self was known as 'the Mauve Zone', and that it could be reached while in a state of deep sleep, where it has the symbolic appearance of a swamp. He also believed that the reality of consciousness, which he deemed the only true reality, was formless and thus presented as a void, although he also taught that it was symbolised by the Hindu goddess Kali and the Thelemic goddess Nuit.

Grant's views on sex magic drew heavily on the importance of sexual dimorphism among humans and the subsequent differentiation of gender roles. Grant taught that the true secret of sex magic were bodily secretions, the most important of which was a woman's menstrual blood. In this he differed from Crowley, who viewed semen as the most important genital secretion. Grant referred to female sexual secretions as kalas, a term adopted from Sanskrit. He thought that because women have kalas, they have oracular and visionary powers. The magical uses of female genital secretions are a recurring theme in Grant's writings.

James Lees

James Lees (August 22, 1939 - 2015) was an English magician known for discovering the system he called English Qaballa. in November 1976, Lees discovered the "order & value of the English Alphabet." Follow this discovery, Lees founded the order O∴A∴A∴ in order to assist others in the pursuit of their own spiritual paths. The first public report of the system known as English Qaballa (EQ) was published in 1979 by Ray Sherwin in an editorial in the final issue of his journal, The New Equinox. Lees subsequently assumed the role of publisher of The New Equinox and, starting in 1981, published additional material about the EQ system over the course of five issues of the journal, extending into 1982.

The "order & value" discovered by James Lees lays the letters out on the grid superimposed on the page of manuscript of Liber AL on which this verse (Ch. III, v. 47) appears (sheet 16 of Chapter III). Also appearing on this page are a diagonal line and a circled cross. The Book of the Law states that the book should only be printed with Crowley's hand-written version included, suggesting that there are mysteries in the "chance shape of the letters and their position to one another" of Crowley's handwriting.  Whichever top-left to bottom-right diagonal is read the magickal order of the letters is obtained.

Little, if any, further material on English Qaballa was published until the appearance of Jake Stratton-Kent's book, The Serpent Tongue: Liber 187, in 2011. This was followed in 2016 by The Magickal Language of the Book of the Law: An English Qaballa Primer by Cath Thompson. An account of the discovery, exploration, and continuing research and development of the system up to 2010, by James Lees and members of his group in England, is detailed in her 2018 book, All This and a Book.

Nema Andahadna
Nema Andahadna (1939-2018) practiced and wrote about magick (magical working, as defined by Aleister Crowley) for over thirty years. In 1974, she channelled a short book called Liber Pennae Praenumbra.

From her experience with Thelemic magick, she developed her own system of magic called "Maat Magick" which has the aim of transforming the human race.  In 1979, she co-founded the Horus-Maat Lodge. The Lodge and her ideas have been featured in the writings of Kenneth Grant.

Her writings have appeared in many publications, including the Cincinnati Journal of Ceremonial Magick, Aeon, and Starfire. According to Donald Michael Kraig:

See also

List of Thelemites

Notes

References

Citations

Works cited

Primary sources

 
 
 
 
 
 
 
 
 
 

 
 
 
 
 
 
 
  Contains a lengthy account of the writing of Nema's Liber Pennae Praenumbra.
  Contains a photo facsimile of Liber Pennae Praenumbra.

Secondary sources

Tertiary sources

Other sources

Free Encyclopedia of Thelema (2005). Thelema. Retrieved March 12, 2005.
Thelemapedia. (2004). Thelema.  Retrieved April 15, 2006.

Further reading

External links

 
 Thelema 101 – a complete introduction to the spiritual philosophy of Thelema
 Thelema at the Internet Sacred Texts Archive – a collection of texts on the topic of Thelema
 Journal of Thelemic Studies – an academic journal investigating the occult tradition of Thelema

 
Aleister Crowley
Ceremonial magic
Magic words
Mysticism
New religious movements
Western esotericism